Glutamate receptor-interacting protein 1 is a protein that in humans is encoded by the GRIP1 gene.

Interactions 

GRIP1 (gene) has been shown to interact with:
 GRM3,
 GRIA2, 
 GRIA3,
 GRIA4,
 GRIK2, and
 GRIK3.

References

Further reading

External links